Kenneth "Kenny" Murphy is a retired American soccer player who played professionally in the North American Soccer League and is currently the head coach of the Connecticut College men's soccer team.

Player

Youth
In 1976, Murphy graduated from Staples High School where was a two-time All State soccer player and a member of a State Championship soccer team.  He also played hockey and was two-time All FCIAC player.  He attended the University of Connecticut, playing on the men's soccer team from 1976 to 1979.  He completed his undergraduate degree in 1982.  In 1986, he earned a master's degree in accounting from Sacred Heart University.

Professional
In 1980, both the Hartford Hellions of the Major Indoor Soccer League and the Detroit Express of the North American Soccer League drafted Murphy.  He signed with the Express for the 1980 season.  In 1981, he moved to the Washington Diplomats before suffering a career ending knee injury in June.

Coach
After his retirement from playing, Murphy worked in both the American Broadcasting Company and CBS Records accounting sections.  He then worked as a commodities broker.  In 2003, he became an assistant coach with Brown University's men's soccer team.  In June 2009, Connecticut College hired Murphy to coach the men's soccer team. In May 2019, Murphy announced his retirement.

References

External links
 NASL stats
 Ken Murphy ’76 Named Connecticut College Coach

1958 births
Living people
American soccer coaches
American soccer players
Brown Bears men's soccer coaches
Detroit Express players
North American Soccer League (1968–1984) players
Washington Diplomats (NASL) players
UConn Huskies men's soccer players
Sacred Heart University alumni
Association football midfielders
Association football defenders
Staples High School alumni
People from Westport, Connecticut
Sportspeople from Fairfield County, Connecticut
Soccer players from Connecticut
Connecticut College Camels men's soccer coaches